Fausto Alesio Acke (born Padovini, 23 May 1897 – 14 May 1967), was an Italian-born Swedish gymnast and discus thrower. Born in Rome he was adopted in 1903 by family friends, after his parents died during an epidemic. His adoptive parents were the Swedish Impressionist painter J. A. G. Acke and Eva Acke (née Topelius), the daughter of the Finnish-Swedish author Zacharias Topelius. Acke was raised in Vaxholm. At the 1920 Summer Olympics, he was part of the Swedish team that won the gold medal in the Swedish system event. He later moved to the Hollywood, where he worked in the movie industry, married sculptor Gerdis Sung, and died aged 69.

References

1897 births
1967 deaths
Athletes from Rome
Italian emigrants to Sweden
Swedish male artistic gymnasts
Swedish male discus throwers
Gymnasts at the 1920 Summer Olympics
Olympic gymnasts of Sweden
Olympic gold medalists for Sweden
Olympic medalists in gymnastics
Medalists at the 1920 Summer Olympics